In computer networking, a softwire protocol is a type of tunneling protocol that creates a virtual "wire" that transparently encapsulates another protocol as if it was an anonymous point-to-point low-level link. Softwires are used for various purposes, one of which is to carry IPv4 traffic over IPv6 and vice versa, in order to support IPv6 transition mechanisms.

References

External links 
 IETF Softwire working group

Computer networking